The 1982–83 Saudi Premier League was the 7th season of Saudi Premier League since its establishment in 1976. Al-Ittihad were the defending champions, having won their 1st title in the previous season. The campaign began on 16 December 1982 and ended on 8 April 1983. The number of teams in the league was reduced from the previous season. The league was contested by 10 teams, the top 5 teams from Groups A and B.

Going into the final matchday, Al-Hilal were leading the table with 1 point ahead of Al-Ettifaq. The two teams would face their city rivals in the final matchday on separate days. On 7 April 1983, Al-Ettifaq defeated Al-Nahda 2–0. This meant that Al-Hilal needed just a draw against Al-Nassr to secure the title, as they were ahead of Al-Ettifaq on goal difference as well. On 8 April 1983, Al-Nassr defeated Al-Hilal 2–1 to hand Al-Ettifaq their first league title. Al-Ettifaq ended the season without a single defeat and became the first Saudi team to ever do so. Al-Ettifaq also became the first team from Dammam to win the title. Khalil Al-Zayani also became the first Saudi Arabian manager to win the league title.

Ohod were the first team to be relegated following a 5–1 away defeat to Al-Shabab on 7 April 1983. The following day, Al-Rawdhah were defeated by Al-Qadisiyah 2–0 and were relegated.

By winning the league title this also meant that Al-Ettifaq would qualify for the 1983 Gulf Club Champions Cup and the 1984 Arab Club Champions Cup, which they went on to win as well.

On 1 April 1983, Abdullah Al-Suwailem assaulted referee Mohammed Foda during the match against Al-Hilal. During the 90th minute while the scores were still level at 1–1, Mohammed Foda sent off Al-Shabab's Al-Suwailem for receiving a pass from the goalkeeper in the 18-yard box. Minutes later in the 2nd minute of stoppage Al-Hilal would go on and score the winner. Al-Suwailem then rushed towards the referee and assaulted him. He was eventually held back by the stadium security. Foda then immediately blew for the final whistle and Al-Shabab's players rushed towards the referee. Foda was escorted out of the stadium by the police. In the aftermath, the Saudi FF suspended 4 players from Al-Shabab and the perpetrator, Al-Suwailem, was put in prison.

The season was also marked by tragedy. On 14 March 1983 Al-Nassr goalkeeper Sultan Marzooq was killed in a car accident, while he was on his way to the team's training ground. He played his final match three days prior in a 3–3 draw against Al-Ahli.

Teams
Ten teams competed in the league – the top five teams from Groups A and B of the previous season. The top five teams from Group A were Al-Shabab, Al-Nassr, Al-Ettifaq, Ohod, and Al-Qadisiyah. The top five teams from Group B were Al-Ittihad, Al-Hilal, Al-Nahda, Al-Ahli, and Al-Rawdhah. 

The ten relegated teams were Al-Tai, Al-Kawkab, Al-Ansar, Al-Riyadh, Al-Wehda, Al-Jabalain, Damac, Al-Khaleej, Al-Taawoun, and Okaz.

Stadiums and locations

League table

Promoted: Al-Wehda, Al Riyadh.

Results

Season statistics

Top scorers

See also
 1983 King Cup 
 1983 Gulf Club Champions Cup
 1984 Arab Club Champions Cup

References

External links 
 RSSSF Stats
 Article writer for Saleh Al-Hoireny - Al-Jazirah newspaper 03-09-2010

Saudi Premier League seasons
Saudi Professional League
Professional League